The Oceans Act of 2000 established the United States Commission on Ocean Policy, a working group tasked with the development of what would be known as the National Oceans Report.

The objective of the report is to promote the following:

 Protection of life and property;
 Stewardship of ocean and coastal resources;
 Protection of marine environment and prevention of marine pollution;
 Enhancement of maritime commerce;
 Expansion of human knowledge of the marine environment;
 Investments in technologies to promote energy and food security;
 Close cooperation among government agencies; and
 U.S. leadership in ocean and coastal activities.

Responses from the executive branch to the commission's report are listed in a National Ocean Policy, sent to the legislative branch.

The act was passed by the United States Congress on July 25, 2000 and signed by the President a fortnight later.

The Commission
 Has 16 members
 U.S. House and U.S. Senate Majority nominate 8 people each and the U.S. President appoints 4 from each list
 U.S. House and U.S. Senate Minority nominates 4 people each and the U.S. President appoints 2 from each
 4 people self-determined by U.S. President

Chair: supervises commission staff and regulates funding.

Members must be "balanced by area of expertise and balanced geographically".

To be eligible, members must be "Representatives, knowledgeable in ocean and coastal activities, from state and local governments, ocean-related industries, academic and technical institutions, and public interest organizations involved with scientific, regulatory, economic, and environmental ocean and coastal activities." (https://web.archive.org/web/20060207190735/http://www.oceancommission.gov/documents/oceanact.html)

The Commission's report is required to include the following, as relevant to U.S. ocean and coastal activities:
 an assessment of facilities (people, vessels, computers, satellites)
 a review of federal activities
 a review of the cumulative effect of federal laws
 a review of the supply and demand for ocean and coastal resources
 a review of the relationships between federal, state, and local governments, and the private sector
 a review of the opportunities for the investment in new products and technologies
 recommendations for modifications to federal laws and/or the structure of federal agencies
 a review of the effectiveness of existing federal interagency policy coordination

The Commission is to give equal consideration to environmental, technical feasibility, economic, and scientific factors. In addition, the recommendations may not be specific to the lands or waters within a single state.

Other Roles
Science Advisory Panel
The Commission consults the Ocean Studies Board to create a science advisory panel. This panel assists in the Commission's report by analyzing and guarantees that all scientific information is accurate and based on the best available data.
Staff
The Commission is authorized to hire an Executive Director and other staff.
Role of states
The U.S. Governor of each coastal state will be given a copy of the Commission's draft report. They will add their own comments to be included the final report. The U.S. President consults the states to formalize his National Ocean Policy.
Other Resources
Any U.S. federal agency and other experts are allowed to provide information to the Commission.

Meetings
The Commission is required to hold public meetings. The Commission must hold at least one meeting in each of 6 specified areas around the country. Meetings must be advertised in the U.S. Federal Register.

Committees
The bill has been referred to the following committees:
U.S. Senate Commerce, Science, and Transportation
U.S. House Resources

Timeline
3/29/2000:Sponsor introductory remarks on measure; Read twice and referred to the Committee on Commerce, Science, and Transportation.
4/13/2000:Committee on Commerce, Science, and Transportation. Ordered to be reported without amendment favorably.
5/23/2000:Committee on Commerce, Science, and Transportation; Reported to Senate by Senator McCain without amendment. With written report No. 106-301; Placed on Senate Legislative Calendar under General Orders. Calendar No. 568.
6/26/2000:Measure laid before Senate by unanimous consent.
S.AMDT.3620 Amendment SA 3620 proposed by Senator Thomas for Senator Hollings; To establish a Commission on Ocean Policy, and for other purposes.
S.AMDT.3620 Amendment SA 3620 agreed to in Senate by Unanimous Consent.
Passed Senate with an amendment by Unanimous Consent.
Message on Senate action sent to the House.
Received in the House.
Referred to the House Committee on Resources.
7/25/2000 Mr. Saxton moved to suspend the rules and pass the bill.
Considered under suspension of the rules.
DEBATE - The House proceeded with forty minutes of debate on S. 2327.
On motion to suspend the rules and pass the bill Agreed to by voice vote.
Motion to reconsider laid on the table Agreed to without objection.
Cleared for White House.
7/27/2000:Presented to President.
8/7/2000:Signed by President.
Became Public Law No: 106-256.

Amendments
S.Amdt. 3620 by U.S. Sen. Hollings [D-SC]
To establish a Commission on Ocean Policy, and for other purposes.
Proposed: June 26, 2000.
Accepted: June 26, 2000.

Funding
The Act provides for $8.5 million for the Commission.

In 1999, $3.5 million was appropriated for the same effort, but never used. Therefore, only $2.5 million would need to be accumulated to completely cover the cost of this act.

Representational Members
Sponsor: U.S. Sen. Ernest Hollings [D-SC]
U.S. President: Bill Clinton
Cosponsors:
Daniel Akaka [D-HI]
Barbara Boxer [D-CA]
John Breaux [D-LA]
Max Cleland [D-GA]
Dianne Feinstein [D-CA]
Daniel Inouye [D-HI]
John Kerry [D-MA]
Mary Landrieu [D-LA]
Frank Lautenberg [D-NJ]
Joseph Lieberman [D-CT]
Daniel Moynihan [D-NY]
Frank Murkowski [R-AK]
Patty Murray [D-WA]
Jack Reed [D-RI]
William Roth [R-DE]
Paul Sarbanes [D-MD]
Chuck Schumer [D-NY]

Biennial Report
A biennial report must be submitted by the U.S. President to Congress of all federal programs incorporated with coastal and ocean activities. This was set to begin in September 2001.

The report must include:
 a description of each program
 the current level of funding for the program
 linkages to other federal programs
 a projection of the funding level for the program for each of the next 5 fiscal years

External links
2006 JOCI Report Card - Where is the U.S. National Ocean Policy? by Don Walsh in Naval Institute Proceedings - July 2006 (p. 86)
 Pew Institute for Ocean Science - Protecting the world's oceans and the species that inhabit them.
US Commission on Ocean Policy
Oceans Act of 2000 Text of Act in PDF format
Commission's page on the Ocean Act
Bill Summary and Status
Bill Overview
Congressional Budget Office Cost Estimate
Administrative Action

Oceanography
2000 in the environment
Acts of the 106th United States Congress
United States federal environmental legislation